USS Andrew Jackson (SSBN-619) was a  nuclear-powered ballistic missile submarine.  It was the second ship of the United States Navy to be named for Andrew Jackson (1767–1845), the seventh President of the United States (1829-1837).

Construction and commissioning
The contract to build Andrew Jackson was awarded to Mare Island Naval Shipyard at Vallejo, California on 23 July 1960 and her keel was laid down on 26 April 1961.  She was launched on 15 September 1962 sponsored by Nancy Patterson Pigott, wife of Tennessee Senator Estes Kefauver, and commissioned on 3 July 1963, with Commander Alfred J. Whittle, Jr. in command of the Blue Crew and Commander James B. Wilson in command of the Gold Crew.

She displaced  when surfaced, and  when submerged. She had a complement of around 120 men, and was armed with 16 Polaris missiles and four  torpedo tubes. She was propelled by a S5W Pressurized Water Nuclear Reactor powering two turbines which generated , driving one propeller.

Operational history

Following commissioning, Andrew Jackson sailed via the Panama Canal to the United States East Coast. On 1 October and 11 October 1963, during shakedown training out of Cape Canaveral, Florida, she successfully launched Polaris A-2 ballistic missiles.  On 26 October 1963, she sent Polaris A-3X missiles into space in the first submerged launching of its type; she repeated the feat on 11 November 1963. On 16 November 1963, six days before his assassination, President John F. Kennedy—embarked in the missile range instrumentation ship —observed Andrew Jackson launch another Polaris A-2 ballistic missile from a point off Cape Canaveral and congratulated Commander Wilson and his crew for "impressive teamwork."

Decommissioning and disposal
Andrew Jackson was decommissioned on 31 August 1989 and stricken from the Naval Vessel Register on the same day. Ex-Andrew Jackson entered the Nuclear Powered Ship and Submarine Recycling Program in Bremerton, Washington. Recycling of Ex-Andrew Jackson was completed 30 August 1999.

Notes

References 

 

Lafayette-class submarines
Cold War submarines of the United States
Nuclear submarines of the United States Navy
Ships built in Vallejo, California
1962 ships